Alan Isler (September 12, 1934 – March 29, 2010) was an American novelist and professor. He left his native England for the United States at age 18, served in the US Army from 1954 to 1956, received a doctorate in English Literature from Columbia University and taught Renaissance Literature at Queens College, City University of New York from 1967 to 1995. In 1994 he won the National Jewish Book Award and the JQ Wingate Prize for his first novel “The Prince of West End Avenue”, which was also a finalist for the National Book Critics Circle Award. He has subsequently published four other works: “Kraven Images” (1996); “The Bacon Fancier”, also known as “Op.Non.Cit.”, (1999); “Clerical Errors” (2002); and “The Living Proof” (2005).

His writing is dense but comical, referential and intellectual in the tradition of Nabokov, and often concerned with the bitter-sweet condition of the solitary Jew in a Gentile world.

Alan Isler died after a long illness on March 29, 2010.

Works

The Prince Of West End Avenue  1994, a comedy set in a New York Jewish old persons' home, and centred on the retirees’ preparations for their upcoming production of Hamlet.
Kraven Images  1996, partly a hilarious sixties-style sex-romp set in a Bronx College, and partly a mad but mournful attempt to resolve the past in London and Yorkshire.
The Bacon Fancier, also published as Op. Non. Cit. 1999, four satirical tales wrought from the sideshows of literature.
Clerical Errors 2002, in which the peregrinations of a Jewish Catholic priest give rise to a fierce yet tender lampoon of Catholicism. German translation "Klerikale Irrtümer", Random House - Berlin Verlag, Berlin  2002, Printed by Friedrich Pustet Verlag Regensburg
The Living Proof  2005, a famous and anti-Semitic painter hires a Jewish biographer.

References

Further reading

 Uwe Meyer: "‘My libido [...] has always been quite normal’: Love and Sexuality Among the Elderly in the Works of Alan Isler". In: Jansohn, Christa (Hg.): Old Age and Ageing in British and American Culture and Literature. Münster 2004, pp. 197–211 (= Studien zur englischen Literatur, hg. v. Dieter Mehl, Bd. 16).
 Uwe Meyer: "‘[T]o rot on inhospitable ground’: The World of Academia In the Works of Alan Isler". In: Fielitz, Sonja / Meyer, Uwe (eds.): Shakespeare. Satire. Academia. Essays in Honour of Wolfgang Weiss. Heidelberg 2012, pp. 143–165 (= Anglistische Forschungen, hg. v. Rüdiger Ahrens, Heinz Antor, Klaus Stierstorfer, Bd. 424).

1934 births
2010 deaths
English satirists
20th-century American novelists
21st-century American novelists
American male novelists
British emigrants to the United States
Columbia Graduate School of Arts and Sciences alumni
Queens College, City University of New York faculty
American academics of English literature
20th-century American male writers
21st-century American male writers
Novelists from New York (state)
20th-century American non-fiction writers
21st-century American non-fiction writers
American male non-fiction writers